Percy Abbott may refer to:

 Percy Abbott (Canadian politician) (1882–1942), alderman in Edmonton, Alberta, Canada
 Percy Abbott (Australian politician) (1869–1940), Australian soldier, politician and solicitor
 Percy Abbott (magician) (1886–1960), Australian magician and magic dealer